Randall Kenan (March 12, 1963 – August 28, 2020) was an American author. Born in Brooklyn, New York, at six weeks old Kenan moved to Duplin County, North Carolina, a small rural community, where he lived with his grandparents in a town named Wallace. Many of Kenan's novels are set around the area of his home in North Carolina. The focus of much of Kenan's work centers around what it means to be black and gay in the southern United States. Some of Kenan's most notable works include the collection of short stories Let the Dead Bury Their Dead, named a New York Times Notable Book in 1992, A Visitation of Spirits, and The Fire This Time. Kenan was the recipient of a Guggenheim Fellowship, a Whiting Award, and the John Dos Passos Prize.

Biography

Early life
Randall Kenan was born in Brooklyn, New York, but at only six weeks old he moved to a small town named Wallace, where he lived with his grandparents. Kenan's grandparents ran a dry-cleaning business, and most of the time they were too busy to take care of Kenan themselves, so they hired someone to take care of him. On the weekends, Kenan's great-aunt Mary and great-uncle Redden would take him to their family farm which was located in Chinquapin, only about 15 miles east of Wallace. When Kenan was three years old, his great-uncle Redden died unexpectedly, and Kenan's grandfather suggested to his great-aunt Mary that she keep Kenan because she was alone. Kenan recalled the conversation, after which he remained with his great-aunt Mary for the remainder of his adolescent years.

Kenan's great-aunt Mary, whom he eventually called "Mama", became a mentor for him, and she taught him how to read at the age of four. Mary was a kindergarten teacher, so she heavily supported education and began Kenan's education at a young age. He grew up loving to read everything, ranging from novels to comic books to the Bible, and he eventually developed a love for storytelling.

Kenan attended the University of North Carolina at Chapel Hill, beginning in the fall of 1981 and he graduated in 1985 with degrees in English and Creative Writing. In his freshman year of college Kenan was pursuing a physics degree, but found himself confused on what to pursue because he was not enjoying his classes. He then decided to enroll in a writing class led by Max Steele, an editor for The Paris Review. Kenan also studied with the author Doris Betts, who tried to get Kenan a job in publishing in New York City. Her efforts were not immediately successful, and it was not until a few months after graduation that Kenan received an offer to work for the book publisher Random House in New York City.

Professional life
Kenan was hired at Random House originally because the company "had gotten into trouble with the Equal Opportunity Commission" and they wanted to increase the number of minorities they had working at the company. After doing odd jobs at Random House, Kenan was able to secure a job at Alfred A. Knopf as a receptionist, where he had opportunities to study his craft. Kenan worked at Knopf for only two months before he was promoted to assistant to the executive vice president, where he remained in that position for five years. While in the assistant position, until 1989, Kenan had the opportunity to edit dozens of books, which helped him improve in his own craft of storytelling. The experience working at Knopf helped Kenan in finalizing what would become his first published novel, A Visitation of Spirits, in 1989.

After publishing A Visitation of Spirits, Kenan began teaching at three universities part time. He taught at Sarah Lawrence College, Columbia University, and Vassar College once a week each, which gave him plenty of time to work on his own writing. Kenan was a full-time professor of English at the University of North Carolina, Chapel Hill. He also served as a visiting writer or writing in residence at a number of other universities, including the University of Mississippi, the University of Memphis, Duke University, and the University of Nebraska-Lincoln.

Writings
Kenan's first novel, A Visitation of Spirits, was published in 1989. While a few critics praised the book, it did not receive much attention; however, this situation changed with the publication in 1992 of Kenan's second book, a collection of short stories titled Let the Dead Bury Their Dead. The stories, based in the fictional community of Tims Creek, focused on (among other things) what it meant to be poor, black, and gay in the southern United States. The book was hailed as a revival of classic southern literature and was nominated for the Los Angeles Times Book Award for Fiction, was a finalist for the National Book Critics Circle Award, and was named a New York Times Notable Book. The short-story collection also brought renewed attention to his first novel, which was likewise set in Tims Creek.
 
In 1993, Kenan published a young adult biography of gay African-American novelist and essayist James Baldwin. Kenan frequently stated that Baldwin was one of his idols. He then spent several years traveling across the United States and Canada collecting oral histories of African Americans, which he published in Walking on Water: Black American Lives at the Turn of the Twenty-first Century (1999).

Kenan won a number of writing awards, including a Guggenheim Fellowship, a Whiting Award, the Sherwood Anderson Award, the John Dos Passos Prize, and the Rome Prize from the American Academy of Arts and Letters.

In 2007, Kenan published The Fire This Time, a non-fiction book whose title references James Baldwin's 1963 The Fire Next Time.

In August 2020, Kenan published If I Had Two Wings, a short-story collection.

Death
Kenan died on August 28, 2020, at his home in Hillsborough, North Carolina, aged 57. At his death, he left an unfinished book titled There's a Man Going 'Round Taking Names.

Bibliography
 A Visitation of Spirits, Grove Press, 1989; Vintage, 2000. Kenan's first novel.
 Let the Dead Bury Their Dead, Harcourt, Brace, 1992. Short story collection.
 James Baldwin: American Writer (Lives of Notable Gay Men & Lesbians), Chelsea House Publications, 1993, 2005. Young adult biography.
 A Time Not Here: The Mississippi Delta, Twin Palms Publishers, 1997. Kenan wrote the text for this collection of photographs by Norman Mauskoff.
 Walking on Water: Black American Lives at the Turn of the Twenty-First Century, Alfred A. Knopf, 1999; Vintage, 2000. Nominated for the Southern Book Award.
 The Fire This Time, Melville House Publishing, 2007
 If I Had Two Wings, W. W. Norton & Company, 2020. Longlisted for the National Book Award.

References

External links
 Randall Kenan's homepage at the University of North Carolina 
 Biographical information and critical analysis of Kenan's works.
 Profile at The Whiting Foundation

1963 births
2020 deaths
20th-century African-American writers
20th-century American biographers
20th-century American male writers
20th-century American novelists
20th-century American short story writers
21st-century African-American writers
21st-century American biographers
21st-century American male writers
21st-century American novelists
21st-century American short story writers
African-American male writers
African-American novelists
American gay writers
American male biographers
American male novelists
American male short story writers
Duke University faculty
Historians from New York (state)
Lambda Literary Award for Gay Fiction winners
LGBT African Americans
LGBT people from New York (state)
LGBT people from North Carolina
Novelists from New York (state)
Novelists from North Carolina
People from Duplin County, North Carolina
Sarah Lawrence College faculty
University of North Carolina at Chapel Hill alumni
Writers from Brooklyn